Deh Now-e Qaleh Olya (also Romanized as Deh Now-e Qal‘eh ‘Olyā; also known as Deh Now Bālā and Deh Now-e Bālā) is a village in Zeydabad Rural District, in the Central District of Sirjan County, Kerman Province, Iran. At the 2006 census, its population was 131, in 36 families.

References 

Populated places in Sirjan County